Brahim Mahamat Ahmat (Arabic: ابراهيم محمد احمد; born 13 November 1995) is a Chadian professional footballer who plays as a forward for Championnat National 2 club Olympique d'Alès en Cévennes  and the Chad national team.

Honours 
Tours

 Championnat National 3: 2019–20

References 

1995 births
Living people
People from N'Djamena
Chadian footballers
French footballers
French sportspeople of Chadian descent
Chadian emigrants to France
Naturalized citizens of France
Association football forwards
US Saint-Pierre-des-Corps players
Avoine OCC players
Tours FC players
Aviron Bayonnais FC players

Division d'Honneur players
Championnat National 3 players
Régional 1 players
Chad international footballers
Black French sportspeople